William C. Anderson may refer to:

William Caldwell Anderson (1804–1870), President of Miami University
William Charles Anderson (1920–2003), author of Bat*21 and U.S. Air Force Colonel during World War II
William Clayton Anderson (1826–1861), United States Representative from Kentucky
William Coleman Anderson (1853–1902), United States Representative from Tennessee
William Crawford Anderson (1877–1919), British socialist politician
William C. Anderson (Air Force) (born 1958), Assistant Secretary of the Air Force 
William C. Anderson, co-author with Zoé Samudzi of As Black as Resistance: Finding the Conditions for Liberation

See also
William Anderson (disambiguation)